Ou Chum is a district located in Ratanakiri Province, in north-east Cambodia. In 1998 it had a population of 11,863. It contains 37 villages, which are located in seven communes.

Communes

References

Districts of Ratanakiri province